is a Japanese character designer and manga artist.  Fujiwara's father was a soldier in the Imperial Japanese Army during World War II. He excelled in mathematics and computer science when in grade school. He graduated from the Kuwasawa Design School. Fujiwara won an honorable mention in 1979 for his debut manga titled Itsu mo no Asa ni in the 18th Tezuka Award   along with Toshio Nobe (also an honorable mention) and Tsukasa Hojo, who won the top prize awarded. He was heavily influenced by Katsuhiro Otomo, and a defining feature of his work is the fine attention to detail. His pen name "Kamui" has its origins in the name of the Ainu god of creation, Kamuy, and he has used it since high school. He has had stories published in the manga anthology series Petit Apple Pie.

Works

Manga
 Buyo Buyo
 "Chameko" (published in Manga Burikko)
 Chocolate Panic
 Clip
 Color Mail
 Deja Vu
 Dragon Quest: Warriors of Eden
 Dragon Quest Retsuden: Roto no Monshō
 Dragon Quest Retsuden: Emblem of Roto Returns
 Dragon Quest Retsuden: Emblem of Roto: Monshō o Tsugumono-tachi e
 Drop
 Fukugami Chōkidan
 H2O (published in Manga Burikko)
 Hot Ai-Q
 Hyōi
 Kanata e
 Kenrō Densetsu: Kerberos Panzer Cops (written by Mamoru Oshii)
 Oine (published in Manga Burikko, originally created by Kentarō Takekuma)
 Old Testament: Genesis Books I & II (initially published by Core, republished by Tokuma Shoten)
 Raika (created by Yū Terashima)
 Saiyūki
 Shifuku Sennen
 Sōseiki
 St. Michaela Gakuen Hyōryūki (created by Ei Takatori)
 Teito Monogatari
 Ultra Q
 Unlucky Young Men
 Yūtopia

Video games
 Bōken Shōnen Kurabu ga Hou (character designer)
 Grandia Xtreme (character designer)
 World Neverland (character designer)
 Gēmu Nihonshi Tenkabito: Odanobunaga (character designer)
 Gēmu Nihonshi Tenkabito: Hidekichi to Ieyasu (character designer)
 Terranigma (art director)
 46 Okunen Monogatari: Harukanaru Eden E (Japanese version cover art)

References

External links
  Kamui's Note (official site)

1959 births
Japanese illustrators
Japanese video game designers
Living people
People from Arakawa, Tokyo
Manga artists from Tokyo
Video game artists